Cockshutt is a civil parish in Shropshire, England.  The parish contains 20 listed buildings that are recorded in the National Heritage List for England.  All the listed buildings are designated at Grade II, the lowest of the three grades, which is applied to "buildings of national importance and special interest".  The parish contains the village of Cockshutt and the surrounding countryside.   Most of the listed buildings are houses, cottages, farmhouses and farm buildings, a high proportion of which are timber framed.  The other listed buildings are a public house and a church with a sundial and memorials in the churchyard, including a war memorial.


Buildings

Notes and references

Notes

Citations

Sources

Lists of buildings and structures in Shropshire